The History of the Bonzos is a 2-disk vinyl album with 35 tracks recorded between 1967 and 1972 by The Bonzo Dog Band and the solo projects of its members, compiled by Andrew Lauder (who was head of Liberty/UA's A&R ). It was released in 1974.

Track listing 
Track listing as given on the original vinyl album cover, UK issue:

References

Bonzo Dog Doo-Dah Band compilation albums
1974 compilation albums
United Artists Records compilation albums